Nelson Elisha Edwards (1887-1954) was one of the first newsreel cameraman in American film history. From 1914 he filmed for Hearst’s International News Service. Edwards filmed the Turkish and German side of World War I.

Nelson Elisha Edwards was born in Point Pleasant, West Virginia, on November 25, 1887. The Edwards family moved to Kansas by covered wagon when Nelson was only six months old. Nelson left the family farm in 1908 to learn photography in Kansas City. From New Orleans he moved to New York City where in 1912 he was working as a press photographer for the Hearst newspapers.  His first major film assignment was in 1914 when Edwards covered the Mexican war. In December 1915, he sailed with Henry Ford’s Peace Ship to Europe and filmed inside the Ottoman Empire and on the Western Front with the German army.  While in Germany, Edwards covered the aftermath of the Battle of Jutland and filmed the German Navy in Wilhemshaven as well as the German Naval High Command. 

On his return to America, Edwards joined the army in December 1917. He was chief cameraman for Fox News in 1919 and had his own photographic agency in Baltimore from 1923, combining freelance photography with newsreel work. Edwards covered the early transatlantic flights, as well as Charles Lindbergh’s return from Paris in 1935. He was a member of the White House Press Photographers Association and covered every inauguration from President Theodore Roosevelt to Harry Truman.

Nelson Edwards died near Reisterstown, Maryland, on October 17, 1954 and was buried at Arlington National Cemetery.

Film work

Edward’s work as a still photographer and newsreel cameraman covers almost half a century. A tall, muscular man with prominent cheekbones and thick black hair, Nelson Edwards was the sort of man who was always ready to pitch in with his camera for a news story. He also never threw anything away, which accounts for many personal papers and scrapbooks that are still in the family collection, containing much inside information on the early days of American newsreels.

While preparing their book American Cinematographers in the Great War, film historians Cooper C. Graham and Ron van Dopperen researched Edwards’ life and work, based on these personal family documents, as well as files at the German archives.

In 2012, a detailed military report on Edwards’ film work at the Western Front was discovered by the authors in the Federal Archives in Berlin.

In February 2016, while doing research at the Military Archives in Freiburg, Germany, the authors found a complete list of movie scenes shot by Edwards, showing the German Navy and close ups of Admirals Reinhard Scheer and Franz von Hipper. The historical footage was taken in June 1916, shortly after the battle of Jutland. Segments from this film report were also retrieved by the authors in the Grinberg Film Collection. The intertitle introducing the scene showing Admiral Scheer boarding his flag ship - a very short flash on film - has a reference to the Hearst International News Pictorial, the newsreel Edwards worked for, and ample evidence that he actually shot these historical scenes.

Research by the authors in 2018 also produced newsreel footage from the German Messter film studio, that was probably shot by Edwards, showing a visit by Field Marshal Von Mackensen to Turkey in 1916.

Sources 

 Kevin Brownlow,The War, the West and the Wilderness (New York/London, 1979)
 Cooper C. Graham and Ron van Dopperen, "Nelson Edwards and the Newsreels: An American Life", Film History, vol. 24 (2012), 260-280, https://muse.jhu.edu/article/485877
 James W. Castellan, Ron van Dopperen, Cooper C. Graham, American Cinematographers in the Great War, 1914-1918 (New Barnet, 2014) https://doi.org/10.2307%2Fj.ctt1bmzn8c
 "German Naval High Command after the Battle of Jutland", shot by Nelson E. Edwards (newsreel footage from Hearst-International News Pictorial, 1916)
 Movie Trailer "American Cinematographers in the Great War, 1914-1918"

References 

war photography
American photojournalists
Hearst Communications people
World War I photographers
People from Point Pleasant, West Virginia
People from Baltimore
Journalists from Kansas
People of the Mexican Revolution
1887 births
1954 deaths
20th-century American photographers
American war photographers
Photographers from West Virginia
Photographers from Kansas
Burials at Arlington National Cemetery
White House photographers